Chinaksen is one of the Districts of Ethiopias in the Oromia  of Ethiopia. East Hararghe Zone. The administrative center of this Aanaa is Chinaksen.

Demographics 
The 2007 national census reported a total population for this woreda of 87,063, of whom 44,925 were men and 42,138 were women; 12,261 or 14.08% of its population were urban dwellers. The majority of the inhabitants said they were Muslim, with 97.96% of the population reporting they observed this belief, while 1.84% of the population practised Ethiopian Orthodox Christianity.

Notes 

Districts of Oromia Region